Dead Funny is a 1994 independent drama film directed by John Feldman. It stars Elizabeth Peña as Vivian Saunders, a woman who comes home from work and finds her boyfriend Reggie Barker (Andrew McCarthy) pinned to her kitchen table with a long knife.

Plot
Vivian Saunders (Elizabeth Peña) comes home one day to an unusual surprise: her boyfriend Reggie Barker (Andrew McCarthy) is lying on the kitchen table with a large sword sticking out of his body. At first Vivian thinks this must be some sort of joke, but she discovers that Reggie is indeed dead, and as she calls her best friend Louise (Paige Turco) to figure out what might have happened and what to do, it occurs to her that she blacked out after too much wine the night before and isn't sure what she did before she passed out. After a few phone calls, Vivian's women's support group arrives, and what to do about Reggie soon takes second place to what Vivian should do for herself.

Cast
Elizabeth Peña as Vivian Saunders
Andrew McCarthy as Reggie Barker
Paige Turco as Louise
Blanche Baker as Barbara
Allison Janney as Jennifer
Adelle Lutz as Mari
Novella Nelson as Frances
Lisa Jane Persky as Sarah
Michael Mantell as Harold
Ken Kensei as Yoshi
Bai Ling as Norriko

Release
This film has only been released on VHS and LaserDisc format.

Reception
David Nusair of DVD Talk negatively reviewed the film, saying "By the time we find out what really happened to McCarthy's character, it's impossible to care."  Time Out also negatively reviewed the film, writing "How did it happen? Who did it? Who cares? Probably not Feldman who seems more interested in shooting his actresses' naked thighs." The New York Times stated that Dead Funny "tries so hard to be ingeniously tricky and ambiguous that it ends up outsmarting itself".

Variety positively reviewed the film, praising Peña's performance.

References

External links

 

1994 films
American drama films
American independent films
1994 drama films
1990s English-language films
1990s American films